Cecil Wilson (9 September 1860 – 20 January 1941) was an English county cricketer and Anglican bishop. He was the third missionary Anglican Bishop of Melanesia from 1894 to 1911, and subsequently, the second Bishop of Bunbury from 1918 to 1937.

Early life and family
Wilson was born at Canonbury in London, the youngest son of Alexander Wilson. He was educated at Tonbridge School, and went up to Jesus College, Cambridge, graduating Bachelor of Arts in divinity in 1882 and Master of Arts in 1885.

On 1 February 1899, Wilson married Alice Ethel Julius, the second daughter of Bishop Julius, at ChristChurch Cathedral.

Cricket
After having played cricket at school, Wilson later played first-class cricket, playing in 28 matches for Kent County Cricket Club between 1882 and 1890. He was awarded his county cap in 1882 and also played in three first-class matches for MCC and two for I Zingari. A right-handed batsman, he scored a total of 1,193 runs in first-class matches, including one century, and in 1882 scored a half-century in each innings against the touring Australian team. He took five wickets and is known to have occasionally played as a wicket-keeper.

Wilson's brother, Leslie Wilson, also played first-class cricket for Kent, making 105 top-level appearances for the side between 1883 and 1897.

Ecclesiastical career
Wilson was ordained by Harold Browne, Bishop of Winchester, as a deacon in 1886, and as a priest the following year. He was in charge of St Faith's mission, in the parish of Portsea, Portsmouth, until 1891. Between 1891 and 1894, he held the incumbency at St John's Moordown, Bournemouth.

In 1894, Wilson was chosen to succeed John Selwyn as Bishop of Melanesia. He left England for New Zealand in April, and was consecrated at St Mary's Cathedral, Auckland, on 11 June 1894. He launched the fifth Southern Cross mission ship in 1903, and advocated for the movement of the centre of Anglican life in Melanesia to the Solomon Islands from Norfolk Island.

Unwilling, however, to himself move to the Solomons, in 1911 he was appointed rector of St Andrew's Church, Walkerville and Archdeacon of Adelaide, South Australia, which posts he held until his Bunbury appointment in 1918.

Wilson is listed in the Calendar of Saints of the Church of the Province of Melanesia.

Wilson died at Perth, Western Australia in 1941 at the age of 80.

Publications

References

External links
Historical documents by Wilson from Project Canterbury
Melanesian Mission Occasional Paper announcing Wilson's selection as Bishop, 1894.
The Wake of the Southern Cross: Work and Adventures in the South Seas, by Cecil Wilson 1932.
Kings Candlesticks - Family Trees
 

Anglican bishops of Melanesia
Anglican bishops of Bunbury
Anglican saints
1860 births
1941 deaths
People educated at Tonbridge School
Alumni of Jesus College, Cambridge
I Zingari cricketers
English cricketers
Marylebone Cricket Club cricketers
Kent cricketers
19th-century Anglican bishops in Oceania